Capua intractana is a species of moth of the family Tortricidae. It is found in Australia, including Tasmania, as well as New Zealand.

References

Tortricinae
Moths of Australia
Moths of New Zealand
Moths described in 1869